KRIX (105.5 FM) is a radio station broadcasting a classic rock format in Port Isabel, Texas. The station is owned by Eduardo S. Gallegos. It's an affiliate of the syndicated Pink Floyd program "Floydian Slip."

History
After obtaining a construction permit in 2016, KLME came to air in April 2019, filing for a license to cover. The station initially broadcast a Regional Mexican music format as "La Mexicana". The call letters were changed to KRIX on March 4, 2020; this call sign had previously been used at 99.5 FM throughout the 1980s.

On April 13, 2020, Gallegos relaunched KRIX as "105.5 Rocket", a classic rock outlet. It was the first classic rock station to launch on the same day in the market alongside a flip of KFRQ which is more mainstream, but later decided to follow the Classic Rock format.

References

External links

RIX
Radio stations established in 2019
2019 establishments in Texas
Classic rock radio stations in the United States